Teja Melink (born 23 March 1980) is a Slovenian pole vaulter.

She finished seventh at the 2005 Summer Universiade. She also competed at the 1998 European Championships, the 2002 European Indoor Championships, the 2004 Olympic Games, the 2005 European Indoor Championships and the 2005 World Championships without reaching the final round.

Her personal best jump is 4.30 metres, achieved in July 2004 in Trieste. This was the Slovenian record at the time.

Competition record

References

1980 births
Living people
Slovenian female pole vaulters
Athletes (track and field) at the 2004 Summer Olympics
Olympic athletes of Slovenia
Athletes (track and field) at the 2005 Mediterranean Games
Mediterranean Games competitors for Slovenia